In condensed matter physics, Bloch's theorem states that solutions to the Schrödinger equation in a periodic potential take the form of a plane wave modulated by a periodic function. The theorem is named after the physicist Felix Bloch, who discovered the theorem in 1929. Mathematically, they are written

Functions of this form are known as Bloch functions or Bloch states, and serve as a suitable basis for the wave functions or states of electrons in crystalline solids.

Named after Swiss physicist Felix Bloch, the description of electrons in terms of Bloch functions, termed Bloch electrons (or less often Bloch Waves),  underlies the concept of electronic band structures.

Also,  is unique only up to a constant reciprocal lattice vector , or, . Therefore, the wave vector  can be restricted to the first Brillouin zone of the reciprocal lattice without loss of generality.

Applications and consequences

Applicability
The most common example of Bloch's theorem is describing electrons in a crystal, especially in characterizing the crystal's electronic properties, such as electronic band structure. However, a Bloch-wave description applies more generally to any wave-like phenomenon in a periodic medium. For example, a periodic dielectric structure in electromagnetism leads to photonic crystals, and a periodic acoustic medium leads to phononic crystals. It is generally treated in the various forms of the dynamical theory of diffraction.

Wave vector 

Suppose an electron is in a Bloch state

where u is periodic with the same periodicity as the crystal lattice. This is important because k and u are not unique. Specifically, if  can be written as above using k, it can also be written using (k + K), where K is any reciprocal lattice vector (see figure at right). Therefore, wave vectors that differ by a reciprocal lattice vector are equivalent, in the sense that they characterize the same set of Bloch states.

The first Brillouin zone is a restricted set of values of k with the property that no two of them are equivalent, yet every possible k is equivalent to one (and only one) vector in the first Brillouin zone. Therefore, if we restrict k to the first Brillouin zone, then every Bloch state has a unique k. Therefore, the first Brillouin zone is often used to depict all of the Bloch states without redundancy, for example in a band structure, and it is used for the same reason in many calculations.

When k is multiplied by the reduced Planck's constant, it equals the electron's crystal momentum. Related to this, the group velocity of an electron can be calculated based on how the energy of a Bloch state varies with k; for more details see crystal momentum.

Detailed example
For a detailed example in which the consequences of Bloch's theorem are worked out in a specific situation, see the article Particle in a one-dimensional lattice (periodic potential).

Bloch's theorem 
Bloch's theorem is as follows:

Proof of theorem

Proof with lattice periodicity

Preliminaries: Crystal symmetries, lattice, and reciprocal lattice 

The defining property of a crystal is translational symmetry, which means that if the crystal is shifted an appropriate amount, it winds up with all its atoms in the same places. (A finite-size crystal cannot have perfect translational symmetry, but it is a useful approximation.)

A three-dimensional crystal has three primitive lattice vectors a1, a2, a3. If the crystal is shifted by any of these three vectors, or a combination of them of the form

where ni are three integers, then the atoms end up in the same set of locations as they started.

Another helpful ingredient in the proof is the reciprocal lattice vectors. These are three vectors b1, b2, b3 (with units of inverse length), with the property that ai · bi = 2π, but ai · bj = 0 when i ≠ j. (For the formula for bi, see reciprocal lattice vector.)

Lemma about translation operators 

Let  denote a translation operator that shifts every wave function by the amount  (as above, nj are integers). The following fact is helpful for the proof of Bloch's theorem:

Proof 
Finally, we are ready for the main proof of Bloch's theorem which is as follows.

As above, let  denote a translation operator that shifts every wave function by the amount , where ni are integers. Because the crystal has translational symmetry, this operator commutes with the Hamiltonian operator. Moreover, every such translation operator commutes with every other. Therefore, there is a simultaneous eigenbasis of the Hamiltonian operator and every possible  operator. This basis is what we are looking for. The wave functions in this basis are energy eigenstates (because they are eigenstates of the Hamiltonian), and they are also Bloch states (because they are eigenstates of the translation operators; see Lemma above).

Proof with operators 
We define the translation operator

with

We use the hypothesis of a mean periodic potential

and the independent electron approximation with an hamiltonian

Given the Hamiltonian is invariant for translations it shall commute with the translation operator

and the two operators shall have a common set of eigenfunctions.
Therefore we start to look at the eigen-functions of the translation operator:

Given  is an additive operator 

If we substitute here the eigenvalue equation and dividing both sides for  we have

This is true for 

where 

if we use the normalization condition over a single primitive cell of volume V

and therefore
 and  where 
Finally

Which is true for a Bloch wave i.e. for 

with

Group theory proof

Velocity and effective mass of Bloch electrons 
If we apply the time-independent Schrödinger equation to the Bloch wave function we obtain

with boundary conditions

Given this is defined in a finite volume we expect an infinite family of eigenvalues; here 
 is a parameter of the Hamiltonian and therefore we arrive at a "continuous family" of eigenvalues  dependent on the continuous parameter  and thus at the basic concept of an electronic band structure.

This shows how the effective momentum can be seen as composed of two parts,

a standard momentum  and a crystal momentum . More precisely the crystal momentum is not a momentum but it stands for the momentum in the same way as the electromagnetic momentum in the minimal coupling, and as part of a canonical transformation of the momentum.

For the effective velocity we can derive

For the effective mass

The quantity on the right multiplied by a factor is called 
effective mass tensor  and we can use it to write a semi-classical equation for a charge carrier in a band

where  is an acceleration. This equation is analogous to the De Broglie wave type of approximation

As an intuitive interpretation, both of the previous two equations resemble formally and are in a semi-classical analogy with the newton equation in an external Lorentz force.

History and related equations

The concept of the Bloch state was developed by Felix Bloch in 1928 to describe the conduction of electrons in crystalline solids. The same underlying mathematics, however, was also discovered independently several times: by George William Hill (1877), Gaston Floquet (1883), and Alexander Lyapunov (1892). As a result, a variety of nomenclatures are common: applied to ordinary differential equations, it is called Floquet theory (or occasionally the Lyapunov–Floquet theorem). The general form of a one-dimensional periodic potential equation is Hill's equation:

where f(t) is a periodic potential. Specific periodic one-dimensional equations include the Kronig–Penney model and Mathieu's equation.

Mathematically Bloch's theorem is interpreted in terms of unitary characters of a lattice group, and is applied to spectral geometry.

A relevant new theory
Based on Bloch's theorem, the conventional theory of electronic states in crystals could not correctly explain genuine crystals' boundary and size effects. However, about half a century ago, the mathematical theory of periodic differential equations had some significant progress. 
Based on those new mathematical understandings, a recent new theory of electronic states in low dimensional systems

aims to understand such effects. The new theory found that the size and boundary effects of electronic states in each specific dimension in the low-dimensional system are separated in some simple but essential cases. 
That is, the energies and properties of some electronic states (including but not limited to the surface states) depend only on the system boundary in that dimension. In contrast, the numbers, energies, and properties 
of other electronic states (they are stationary Bloch states, usually many times more) depend only on the system size in that dimension, 
see "A more general model: particle in a box with a period potential in Particle in a box."

There is a significant difference between the band structures of Bloch waves in one-dimensional and multi-dimensional space. The Schrödinger differential equation for a one-dimensional periodic potential 
is an ordinary differential equation that cannot have more than two linearly independent solutions; this leads to each permitted band and each band gap existing alternatively as the energy increases. 
Correspondingly, a theorem in the theory of ordinary periodic differential equations
 
limits that a boundary-dependent state is either in a band gap or at a band edge. On the other hand, the Schrödinger differential equation for a multi-dimensional periodic potential is a partial differential equation 
with no limitation to the number of independent solutions. As a result, the permitted bands in a multi-dimensional crystal are often overlapped. The number of band gaps in a multi-dimensional crystal is always finite. Furthermore, there are no band gaps if the potential is minimal. Correspondingly, a theorem in the theory of partial periodic differential equations
 
limits that the energy of a boundary-dependent state in a multi-dimensional crystal must be higher or equal to the upper band edge of the relevant permitted band without giving an upper limit. Therefore, a boundary-dependent state decaying in a specific direction can have energy in the range of a permitted band of the bulk. Theoretically, such cases are rather general in multi-dimensional crystals.

The very existence of the boundary-dependent states or sub-bands leads to the properties of electronic states in a simple low-dimensional system being substantially different from the properties of electronic states based on Bloch's theorem as in conventional solid-state physics. And also significantly different from what is widely believed in the solid-state physics community regarding the properties of electronic states in a low-dimensional system or finite crystal, such as ideas based on effective mass concepts. Since the energy of each boundary-dependent state is always higher than the energies of its relevant Bloch stationary states 
(see Particle in a box), 
the energy gap between occupied and vacant states in an ideal low-dimensional system of a cubic semiconductor is smaller than the band gap of the bulk semiconductor. An essential difference between a bulk metal and a bulk semiconductor would not be so clear when the size of the crystal becomes small enough, so the effects of the boundary-dependent electronic states become more significant. A low-dimensional system of a cubic semiconductor crystal could even have the electrical conductivity properties of metal.

As a one-electron and non-spin theory, this new theory is more general than the conventional theory of electronic states in crystals based on Bloch's theorem and the well-known  "Particle in a box" model in quantum mechanics:
The new theory contains the physics cores that the each of the two classical theories has separately: That is, the
former's potential periodicity and the latter's boundary and finite size.

See also

 Bloch oscillations
 Bloch wave – MoM method
 Electronic band structure
 Nearly free electron model
 Periodic boundary conditions
 Symmetries in quantum mechanics
 Tight-binding model
 Wannier function

References

Further reading

 
 
 
 
 
 
  

Quantum states
Condensed matter physics